Héctor "Ettore" Puricelli (15 September 1916 – 14 May 2001) was a football player and manager who played as a striker. Born in Uruguay, he represented Italy at international level. As a player, he is most famous for his time with Italian clubs Bologna and Milan. A prolific goalscorer, he was known for his ability in the air, which earned him the nickname "testina d'oro" ("golden little head," in Italian).

Career
After playing for his hometown side Central Español from Montevideo, Puricelli decided to move from Uruguay to Italy in 1938 to play for Serie A side Bologna. The club were going through a good spell in their history and with goals from Puricelli they were able to continue that; in his first season they won the Italian championship of 1938–39.

In his first season Puricelli was joint-capcannoniere (top scorer) in Serie A, along with Aldo Boffi of Milan, with 19 goals. He repeated this feat in 1940–41 with 22 goals, also winning his second league title with Bologna that season.

After World War II, Puricelli joined Milan and although his goalscoring record continued in healthy fashion, the club did not capture the league championship; the nearest they came during this period was runners-up in 1947–48, serving as the team's captain. He ended his playing career with Legnano in Serie B still prolific in his goalscoring.

Honours

Player

Club
Bologna
Serie A: 1938–39, 1940–41

Individual
Capocannoniere: 1938–39, 1940–41

Manager
A.C. Milan
Serie A: 1954–55

References

1916 births
2001 deaths
Italian footballers
Association football forwards
Club Atlético River Plate (Montevideo) players
Central Español players
A.C. Milan players
Bologna F.C. 1909 players
A.C. Legnano players
Serie A players
Serie B players
Italy international footballers
Footballers from Montevideo
Uruguayan footballers
Uruguayan people of Italian descent
Uruguayan football managers
A.C. Milan managers
Palermo F.C. managers
FC Porto managers
U.S. Salernitana 1919 managers
Atalanta B.C. managers
U.S. Alessandria Calcio 1912 managers
Cagliari Calcio managers
L.R. Vicenza managers
Genoa C.F.C. managers